is an adventure RPG for the PlayStation Portable developed by Killaware and published by FuRyu. The game was released on January 27, 2011, in Japan.

Gameplay 
As Yūto, the player will explore the school and look for objects that might be occupied by a spirit. Once the player finds an object that is believed to be possessed, the player can take a picture of it with the mobile phone. Each time the player takes a photo, 5 minutes of in-game time pass. During battles, the player can send an e-mail from the mobile phone with a particular picture attached to it to summon the respective spirit to aid Yūto.

Tsukumonogatari emphasizes the "power of words" as part of its battle system. Yūto’s school is populated by several people, including his friends and the school staff themselves. The player can go around talking to different people at school, and engaging in conversation with them. Occasionally, they’ll narrate a proverb or a rumor or a myth to the player. These are "words".

Different "words" can be attached to spirits during battles to give them various abilities, and they are vital when battling against the Ayakashi. When a battle begins, the player will be able to summon a spirit and add up to a maximum of three "words" to it to decide what abilities it will possess in battle.

Plot 
"That is unacceptable now. You've known the secret.There is a story of a boy who can see AYAKASHI, not visible to human eye."

Story 
One day, Yūto Ishigami finds himself pushed out of a classroom window by a fellow student. Miraculously, he survives the fall, and wakes up with the ability to see the supernatural. Yūto’s school has been invaded by demons, known as "Ayakashi". These are the cause for the recent incidents that have been plaguing people. Luckily, objects known as "Yorishiro" — everyday items occupied by helpful spirits — are strewn in abundance around the school as well, and these are the key to combating the Ayakashi invasion.

Characters

Music 
JUST.

External links

References 

2011 video games
Adventure games
FuRyu games
Japan-exclusive video games
PlayStation Portable games
PlayStation Portable-only games
Role-playing video games
Video games developed in Japan